Hendrik Dirk Kruseman van Elten (Alkmaar; November 14, 1829 in Alkmaar — July 12, 1904 in Paris) was a Dutch landscape painter, etcher and lithographer.

He studied in Haarlem, later with Cornelis Lieste, and later in Germany, Switzerland,  Tirol, Brussels and Amsterdam. In 1865 he moved to New York City, from 1870 to 1873, he moved back to Europe and in 1883 he became a member or the National Academy Museum and School.

Notes and references

External links
 Artwork by Hendrik-Dirk Kruseman Van Elten

1829 births
1904 deaths
19th-century Dutch painters
20th-century Dutch painters
Dutch etchers
Dutch landscape painters
Dutch lithographers
People from Alkmaar